The Asia/Oceania Zone was one of the three zones of the regional Davis Cup competition in 1999.

In the Asia/Oceania Zone there were four different tiers, called groups, in which teams competed against each other to advance to the upper tier. The top two teams in Group IV advanced to the Asia/Oceania Zone Group III in 2000. All other teams remained in Group IV.

Participating nations

Draw
 Venue: National Centre, Bandar Seri Begawan, Brunei
 Date: 3–7 February

Group A

Group B

1st to 4th place play-offs

5th to 8th place play-offs

Final standings

  and  promoted to Group III in 2000.

Round robin

Group A

Brunei vs. United Arab Emirates

Iraq vs. Singapore

Brunei vs. Singapore

Iraq vs. United Arab Emirates

Brunei vs. Iraq

Singapore vs. United Arab Emirates

Group B

Fiji vs. Oman

Jordan vs. Kuwait

Fiji vs. Kuwait

Jordan vs. Oman

Fiji vs. Jordan

Kuwait vs. Oman

1st to 4th place play-offs

Semifinals

Singapore vs. Oman

Kuwait vs. United Arab Emirates

Final

Singapore vs. Kuwait

3rd to 4th play-off

Oman vs. United Arab Emirates

5th to 8th place play-offs

5th to 8th play-offs

Iraq vs. Fiji

Brunei vs. Jordan

5th to 6th play-off

Fiji vs. Jordan

7th to 8th play-off

Iraq vs. Brunei

References

External links
Davis Cup official website

Davis Cup Asia/Oceania Zone
Asia Oceania Zone Group IV